Alisma lanceolatum is a species of aquatic plant in the water plantain family known by the common names lanceleaf water plantain and narrow-leaved water plantain. It is widespread across Europe, North Africa and temperate Asia. It is naturalized in Australia, New Zealand, Oregon, California and British Columbia. It is considered a noxious weed in some places.

This species is a weed of rice fields in many areas, including New South Wales and California.

In England and Wales it is occasionally locally found, in Ireland it is rare, and Scotland it is very rare.

It is found in mud and in fresh waters.

Description

This is a perennial herb growing from a caudex in the water or mud that typically reaches a height of about 0.7 meters and a spread of 0.25 meters. It produces lance-shaped leaves 12 to 20 centimeters long and 4 wide on long petioles; leaves which remain submerged in water are smaller and less prominently veined. The inflorescence is mostly erect and up to half a meter tall.

It produces a wide array of small pinkish-purple three-petalled flowers that open in the morning, from June until August. The fruit is a tiny achene up to 2 or 3 millimeters long clustered into an aggregate fruit of about 20 units. The seeds are reddish-brown and about 1.5 millimeters long.

Cultivation 
Grows best in water 15-30 centimeters deep in full sun. Suitable for USDA hardiness zones 5–8.

Similar Species
The water plantain Alisma plantago-aquatica has acute leaf tips not tapering to a stalk. The flowers of A. plantago-aquatica also typically open in the afternoon, and the leaves are wider.

References

External links
Jepson Manual Treatment
Weeds Australia Alisma lanceolatum
Calflora taxon report Alisma lanceolatum
Altervista Flora Italiana, Mestolaccia lanceolata, Alisma lanceolatum
Flore Alpes, Alisma lancéolé, Alisma lanceolatum
Le Jardin du Pic Vert, Plantain d'eau à feuilles lancéolées, Alisma lanceolatum
Flora On Portugal, Alisma lanceolatum
New Zealand Plant Conservation Network, Alisma lanceolatum
Wilde Plante in Nederland en Belgie, Slanke waterweegbree (Middelste waterweegbree), Ier kikkertsblêd, Narrow-leaved Water-plantain, Plantain lancéolé (Plantain d'eau lancéolé), Lanzettblättriger Froschlöffel, Alisma lanceolatum 

lanceolatum
Freshwater plants
Plants described in 1796
Flora of the Canary Islands
Flora of Switzerland
Flora of Russia
Flora of Central Asia
Flora of Siberia
Flora of China
Flora of Asia
Flora of Europe
Flora of Australia
Flora of New Zealand
Flora of California
Flora of British Columbia